The 1942 Duquesne Dukes football team was an American football team that represented Duquesne University as an independent during the 1942 college football season. In its fourth season under head coach Aldo Donelli, Duquesne compiled a 6–3–1 record and outscored opponents by a total of 143 to 58.

Schedule

References

Duquesne
Duquesne Dukes football seasons
Duquesne Dukes football